Made in Ash is a 2012 Slovak drama film directed by Iveta Grófová. The film was selected as the Slovak entry for the Best Foreign Language Oscar at the 85th Academy Awards, but did not make the final shortlist.

Cast
 Dorotka Billa as Dorotka
 Maria Billa
 Jarka Bucincova
 Silvia Halusicova
 Robin Schmidt

See also
 List of submissions to the 85th Academy Awards for Best Foreign Language Film
 List of Slovak submissions for the Academy Award for Best Foreign Language Film

References

External links
 

2012 films
2012 drama films
2012 directorial debut films
Slovak-language films
Slovak drama films